Immanuel Ness is a scholar of worker's organisation, migration, mobilisation and politics and labour activist teaching at Brooklyn College of the City University of New York.

His contribution is on worker's movements and party formation in the Global South, where he has worked with leading activists in India, South Africa, and beyond. In 1990, he founded the New York Unemployed Committee. He is author and editor of numerous articles and academic and popular books on labour, worker insurgencies and trade unions. Notably, he worked with Mexican workers, unions, and community organizations in New York City to establish a Code of Conduct for migrant laborers in 2001 who were paid below minimum wage.

Published work
Ness is editor of the Journal of Labor and Society, JLSO in short, is a quarterly peer-review social science publication founded in 1997 that examines global political economy, imperialism, workers and labor organisations, and assesses transformative social movements. JLSO editorial board includes scholars in academia and activists in labour movements throughout the world, including Marcel van der Linden, Frances Fox Piven Amiya Kumar Bagchi and Samir Amin. Ness is general editor of the eight-volume Encyclopedia of Revolution and Protest: 1500 to the Present, Encyclopedia of Global Human Migration, and the Palgrave Encyclopedia of Imperialism and Anti-Imperialism, published from 2009 to 2016. His research primarily concerns the situation and politics of the international working class and, more generally, "the poor", as well as low-wage labour or contractual and informal workers, particularly in the Global South.

His works include "Organizing Insurgency: Workers' Movements in the Global South" "Southern Insurgency: The Coming of the Global Working Class" (Pluto 2015) "Immigrants, Unions and the New U.S. Labor Market" & Choke Points: Logistics Workers Disrupting the Global Supply Chain w/ Jake Alimahomed-Wilson (Pluto Press 2018) and Guest Workers and U.S. Corporate Despotism (University of Illinois Press 2011). His numerous editing projects include the Encyclopedia of American Social Movements (M.E Sharpe). The four volume work was recipient of the American Library Association, Best Reference Source.

In 2011, he co-edited Ours to Master and to Own: Workers Councils from the Commune to the Present (Haymarket Books 2011/Neuer ISP Verlag 2013). The volume covers 22 case histories of factory occupations and workers' councils over the past 150 years. His publications appear in English, Spanish, German, Italian, French, Chinese, and Japanese. Ness is general editor of Encyclopedia of Global Human Migration (Wiley Blackwell 2013), a 5-volume examination of human mobility from prehistory to the present. In 2014, Ness authored a book titled Southern Insurgency: the Rise of the Global Working Class.

Practice and Theory

He was a trade union organiser in the U.S. and labour activist in the Global South from 1989 to 2021. During this period, he learned to advocate on behalf of disconnected jobless workers to organize their own association directly at New York State unemployed offices. In 1990, he co-founded the New York Unemployed Committee (1990–1993), which successfully organised jobless workers at New York State unemployment centers to press for federal unemployment benefit extensions through public protests and demonstrations directed at national and state elected officials, in many cases, often members of the Democratic Party who had surrendered to Republicans during the presidency of George H.W. Bush. Rallies were held in New York City, and with other jobless organizations in Washington, DC, and Kennebunkport, Maine, vacation home of Bush in August 1991.

Fordism, Post-Fordism and Community labor coalition

Ness' work is rooted in understanding production and manufacturing as essential to understanding the labour movement and capitalism. Fordism is viewed as an exceptional period which is not the norm; rather the dispersal of industry has pushed the development of contractors and dispersed work sites. In this way, in 1998, he co-founded the Lower East Side Community Labor Coalition in New York City with Michael Farrin, Cèsar Ayala and members of progressive and leftist local groups, which mobilised low-wage workers with support of UNITE Local 169, a labor union in the neighborhood that was previously affiliated with the Amalgamated Clothing and Textile Workers Union. The campaign expanded into a successful effort to mobilise Mexican and Latino immigrant workers along with Mexican workers and the Mexican American Workers Association (AMAT), a workers' center in New York. He helped organise large Mayday demonstrations in New York City, centered around authentic-worker led mobilizations for immigrant rights from 1999 to 2001, often culminating in mass arrests of street theatre and protests by New York City police, setting a precedent of immigrant leadership and participation in the US organisation of the annual worldwide labour holiday. In 2002, when the greengrocer workers campaign ended as part of a trade union brokered deal between two rival unions, Ness vocally opposed the bureaucratic arrangement, and became disenchanted with the failure of established and traditional labour unions to defend worker interests at a time when the power of immigrant workers were at a peak in New York. At the time he also withdrawn and criticised progressive local Democratic Party operatives for their entrance into mainstream politics, and failure to move beyond conventional electoral politics to community-based organizing.

Working class spontaneity and Marxism–Leninism

In 2000, his research became more critical of traditional unions, and he began to participate in advancing rank-and-file self-activity outside of traditional structures through new forms of autonomist Marxist unions. His advocacy included solidarity efforts with new and independent unions that had few or limited links to trade union centers and affiliates. His work included support for unions where workers had formed parallel structures of representation in the U.S. and in other countries. Much of his organising since 2010 has focused on a rejection of utopian and idealist notions propounded by social democrats and other leftists and applying classical Marxism to ongoing struggles, re-conceptualisation of the nature of the working class as a social force, and supporting the formation of building disciplined workers parties, both accountable to mass workers.

Publications 1995 to 2012

As he initiated a campaign in New York city to advance the rights of the most exploited migrant workers, his scholarly output also centered on the immigrant workers. He is completing the co-authored work: Migration in a World of Inequality (Monthly Review Press 2014). Ness is also writing on working class self-activity, labour migration, anarcho-syndicalism, workers' councils and cooperatives and new forms of worker organization in the United States, Caribbean, Africa, South Asia, Latin America, and Europe. He is researching independent workers organisations and documenting mobilizations outside of traditional labour models—including efforts to organise autonomous and syndicalist unions outside traditional labour jurisdictions, anti-capitalism, and opposition to global neoliberal governance. He is currently on the advisory board of the New York City Network on Worker Cooperatives. He has collaborated on projects on migration, film, and working class studies, and imperialism including a special issues of "Crossings" and a major comprehensive work titled: Imperialism and Anti-Imperialism (forthcoming 2014).

Bibliography
Ours to Master and to Own: Workers Councils from the Commune to the Present (Haymarket Books 2011/Nuerer ISP Verlag 2011)
Encyclopedia of American Social Movements (2004, Sharpe Reference)
Immigrants, Unions and the New U.S. Labor Market (Temple University Press 2005)
Guest Workers and U.S. Corporate Despotism (University of Illinois Press 2011)
Encyclopedia of Revolution and Protest: 1500 to the Present (Wiley-Blackwell Publishers 2009)
The Encyclopedia of Global Human Migration (Wiley-Blackwell Publishers 2013)
Southern Insurgency: The Coming of the Global Working Class (Wildcat 15 November 2015)
The Palgrave Encyclopedia of Imperialism and Anti-Imperialism ed. with Zak Cope (Palgrave Macmillan UK 2016)

References

Living people
Brooklyn College faculty
Trade unionists from New York (state)
American male writers
Labor historians
1958 births